AT-rich interactive domain-containing protein 2 (ARID2) is a protein that in humans is encoded by the ARID2 gene.

Function 

ARID2 is a subunit of the PBAF chromatin-remodeling complex, which facilitates ligand-dependent transcriptional activation by nuclear receptors.

Structure
The ARID2 protein contains two conserved C-terminal C2H2 zinc fingers motifs, a region rich in the amino acid residues proline and glutamine, a RFX (regulatory factor X)-type winged-helix DNA-binding domain, and a conserved N-terminal AT-rich DNA interaction domain—the last domain for which the protein is named.

Clinical significance
Mutation studies have revealed ARID2 to be a significant tumor suppressor in many cancer subtypes. ARID2 mutations are prevalent in hepatocellular carcinoma and melanoma. Mutations are present in a smaller but significant fraction in a wide range of other tumors. ARID2 mutations are enriched in hepatitis C virus-associated hepatocellular carcinoma in the US and European patient populations compared with the overall mutation frequency.

Model organisms

The ARID2 gene, located on chromosome 12q in humans, consists of 21 exons; orthologs are known from mouse, rat, cattle, chicken, and mosquito. Model organisms have been used in the study of ARID2 function. A conditional knockout mouse line, called Arid2tm1a(EUCOMM)Wtsi was generated as part of the International Knockout Mouse Consortium program, a high-throughput mutagenesis project to generate and distribute animal models of disease to interested scientists.

Male and female animals underwent a standardized phenotypic screen to determine the effects of deletion. Twenty six tests were carried out on mutant adult mice and two significant abnormalities were observed.  A recessive lethal study found fewer homozygous mutant embryos during gestation than predicted by Mendelian ratio. In a second study, no homozygous mutant animals survived until weaning. The remaining tests were carried out on heterozygous mutant adult mice; these displayed no abnormalities.

References

Further reading

External links 
 
 

Transcription factors
Genes mutated in mice